A Study in Scarlet is a 1914 British silent drama film directed by George Pearson and starring James Bragington, making him the first English actor to portray Holmes on film. It is based on the Sir Arthur Conan Doyle 1887 novel of the same name and is considered to be lost. An American film of the same name was released in the U.S. on the following day, 29 December 1914. , the film is missing from the BFI National Archive, and is listed as one of the British Film Institute's "75 Most Wanted" lost films.

Production
Ward Lock & Co, original publishers of A Study in Scarlet in the November 1887  edition of Beeton's Christmas Annual, had the comprehensive rights to the book. The company sold the film rights to G. B. Samuelson and his film company.

Samuelson's plans for the film were ambitious with outdoor scenes filmed at Cheddar Gorge in Cheddar, Somerset, England doubling for Utah in the United States.

James Bragington was an employee of Samuelson's company and was cast purely due to his resemblance to Sidney Paget's famous illustrations of Holmes. Author Alan Barnes theorizes that Bragington may have been the first actor to wear a deerstalker on screen.

The success of the film led Samuelson to make another Sherlock Holmes film two years later, The Valley of Fear.

Cast
 James Bragington as Sherlock Holmes
 Fred Paul as Jefferson Hope
 Agnes Glynne as Lucy Ferrier
 Henry Paulo as John Ferrier
 James Le Fre as Father
 Winifred Pearson as Lucy, a Child

See also
 List of lost films

References

External links

British Film Institute entry, including extensive notes

1914 films
1914 drama films
1914 lost films
British silent feature films
British drama films
British black-and-white films
Lost British films
Lost drama films
Films directed by George Pearson
Sherlock Holmes films based on works by Arthur Conan Doyle
1910s British films
Silent drama films
Silent mystery films
Silent thriller films
1910s English-language films